Beatriz Artolazabal is a Spanish politician affiliated with the Basque National Party. From 28 November 2016 to 8 September 2020, she served as Minister for Employment and Social Policies in the Second Urkullu Government. From 8 September 2020 to 14 February 2023, she served as Minister of Equality, Justice and Social Policies in the Third Urkullu Government led by Iñigo Urkullu.

Early life and education 
She was born in Vitoria-Gasteiz in 1970. She holds a degree in Economy and Business Administration from the University of the Basque Country, specialising in International Economy and Development.

Career 
She worked as administrative officer for various companies. From 1995 to 1996 she worked on computer and administrative tasks for Gizaker S.L., and in 1998 she realised an internship in Guascor I+D. She later worked as administrative officer and salesperson in Astilan, a company of Sormen Group, from 1998 to 1999. In 1999 she joined Logic Control S.A., where she was the sales manager until 2000.

In 2000, she became a councillor of the City Council of Vitoria-Gasteiz. She contested the 1999 election on the Basque National Party's ticket, but she failed to be elected. However, she was later elected to fill a vacancy of a fellow party member. She was elected again after the 2003 election, and she continued as a councillor from the opposition until 2007.

In 2008, she was named economic manager of Hospital Santiago in Vitoria-Gasteiz. She stepped down in 2011, and worked as organisation consultant from 2011 to 2013. From 2012 to 2013 she was a member of the Basque National Party's Executive Branch of Álava (ABB). In 2013, she became the Enonomic Manager of Osakidetza, the Basque Health Service.

She left Osakidetza in 2015, in order to serve as Deputy for Social Services in the Provincial Council of Álava. She resigned in 2016, upon being named Minister of Employment and Social Policies by lehendakari Iñigo Urkullu for his second government. After the 2020 Basque regional election, Artolazabal continued as Minister of Equality, Justice and Social Policies in the Third Urkullu Government.

In autumn 2022, media speculation grew regarding the Basque National Party's list of candidates to contest the May 2023 local and foral elections. Various outlets pointed to Artolazabal as a potential candidate to replace Gorka Urtaran for the Vitoria-Gasteiz mayoral contest. She was ultimately proposed to fill that post by the party's executive branch of Alava.

Personal life 
She lives in Mendibil, Arratzua-Ubarrundia. She is married and she has two children.

Electoral history

References 

Living people
1970 births
People from Vitoria-Gasteiz
Basque women in politics
Basque Nationalist Party politicians
Members of the 11th Basque Parliament
University of the Basque Country alumni
Government ministers of the Basque Country (autonomous community)
Women members of the Basque Parliament
Municipal councillors in the Basque Country (autonomous community)